Critical Reconstruction is a theory of architecture and urbanism originally developed by the Berlin architect Josef Paul Kleihues. It was first applied in Berlin's International Building Exhibition in the 1980s, and was subsequently used in the reconstruction of the city after the fall of the Berlin Wall under Senate Building Director Hans Stimmann. Critical Reconstruction encouraged a return to traditional (pre-World War II) architectural styles and typologies, and sought to recreate the pedestrian-centered urban street life of the early twentieth-century European metropolis through the restoration of the inner city’s original baroque-era street plan.

Post-wall Critical Reconstruction in Berlin was closely associated with an architectural approach called "New Simplicity," theorized by Vittorio Magnago Lampugnani and championed by architect Hans Kollhoff.

Hans Stimmann also used Critical Reconstruction as the basis for his Planwerk Innenstadt, an inner-city development plan for Berlin that favored the demolition of mid-century buildings and the infill of empty plots with higher-density, mixed-use structures.

Major examples of Critical Reconstruction in Berlin include Potsdamer Platz, the Friedrichstadt Passagen, and Alexanderplatz.

See also
 International Building Exhibition Berlin

References
Hohensee, Naraelle. Building in Public: Critical Reconstruction and the Rebuilding of Berlin after 1990. Ph.D. dissertation, CUNY Graduate Center, 2016.

Bodenschatz, Harald, and Uwe Altrock. Renaissance der Mitte: Zentrumsumbau in London und Berlin. Berlin: Verlagshaus Braun, 2005.

Brichetti, Katharina. Die Paradoxie des postmodernen Historismus: Stadtumbau und städtebauliche Denkmalpflege vom 19. bis zum 21. Jahrhundert am Beispiel von Berlin und Beirut. Berlin: Schiler, 2009.

Burg, Annegret. Berlin Mitte: die Entstehung einer urbanen Architektur. Edited by Hans Stimmann. Berlin: Birkhäuser Verlag, 1995.

Feireiss, Kristin, ed. Alexanderplatz: Städtebaulicher Ideenwettbewerb. Translated by Michael Robinson and Hans H. Harbort. Berlin: Ernst & Sohn, 1994.

Hennecke, Stefanie. Die kritische Rekonstruktion als Leitbild: Stadtentwicklungspolitik in Berlin zwischen 1991 und 1999. Hamburg: Kovač, 2010.

Hertweck, Florian. Der Berliner Architekturstreit: Architektur, Stadtbau, Geschichte und Identität in der Berliner Republik 1989-1999. Berlin: Gebr. Mann, 2010.

Stadt Der Architektur, Architektur Der Stadt: Berlin 1900-2000, edited by Thorsten Scheer, Josef Paul Kleihues, and Paul Kahlfeldt, 381–87. Berlin: Nicolai, 2000.

Ladd, Brian. The Ghosts of Berlin: Confronting German History in the Urban Landscape. Chicago, Ill.: University of Chicago Press, 1998.

Lenhart, Karin. Berliner Metropoly: Stadtentwicklungspolitik Im Berliner Bezirk Mitte Nach Der Wende. Opladen: Leske + Budrich, 2001.

Strom, Elizabeth A. Building the New Berlin: The Politics of Urban Development in Germany’s Capital City. Lanham, Md.: Lexington Books, 2001.

Till, Karen E. The New Berlin: Memory, Politics, Place. Minneapolis: University of Minnesota Press, 2005.

Ward, Janet. Post-Wall Berlin : Borders, Space and Identity. Houndmills, Basingstoke, Hampshire; New York: Palgrave Macmillan, 2011.

Berlin Wall
Urban planning
Urban design